"You Will Never Work in Television Again" is a song by the English rock band the Smile. It was released on 5 January 2022 as the debut single from their debut album, A Light for Attracting Attention. The Smile first performed it in the 2021 Glastonbury livestream Live at Worthy Farm.

Reception
Some publications compared "You Will Never Work in Television Again" favourably to Thom Yorke and Jonny Greenwood's main band Radiohead. Tyler Golsen of Far Out Magazine gave it 8.3/10, calling it "a solid and powerful rocker that lets the guys in Radiohead just hang loose and rock out for the first time in a while". The NPR writer Brian Burns likened it to the post-punk acts Mission of Burma and Swell Maps, while the Guitar World writer Jackson Maxwell compared it to Sonic Youth.

Music video
The band released a lyric video alongside the single directed by Duncan Loudon. The video features the song's lyrics scrolling past on a teleprompter. Far Out Magazine described the video as "eerie".

Personnel
Credits adapted from album liner notes.

The Smile
Thom Yorke – vocals, guitar
Jonny Greenwood – guitar, bass
Tom Skinner – drums

Production
Nigel Godrich

References

The Smile songs
2022 songs
Songs written by Jonny Greenwood
Songs written by Thom Yorke